Maksimović is a Serbian patronymic surname meaning son of Maksim.

Aleksandar Maksimović, Serbian sport wrestler
Boban Maksimović, Swiss footballer
Desanka Maksimović, Serbian poet
Dragan Maksimović, actor
Goran Maksimović, Serbian sports shooter
Ivan Maksimović, musician
Ivana Maksimović, sport shooter
Jelena Maksimović, basketball player
Ljubomir Maksimović, Serbian Byzantologist
Marko Maksimović, Bosnian-Serb footballer
Mina Maksimović, basketball player
Nemanja Maksimović, Serbian footballer
Nikola Maksimović, footballer
Novica Maksimović, footballer
Rajko Maksimović, composer, writer, and music pedagogue
Srđan Maksimović, footballer
Suzana Maksimović, Serbian chess master

See also
Maximov - East Slavic version of the same surname

Serbian surnames
Patronymic surnames